Walter Crucce (born ) is a retired male boxer from Argentina, who won the gold medal in the men's light-welterweight (– 63.5 kg) category at the 1995 Pan American Games in Mar del Plata, Argentina. In the final he defeated Puerto Rico's Luis Deines Pérez. 
Crucce made his professional debut on 1995-07-08 defeating Sandro Ramon Sosa on knock-out.
For the press and much of the general public, Crucce was considered in the 90's as the future of Argentine boxing.
It was a great puncher and in his first 22 fights, ten were won in the first round.
Over time his career was devaluing by weight problems.
His last fight was on 2012/08/28, when he retired in the 6th round against Brazilian boxer Junior Jackson, for the WBO Latino title in the light heavyweight category.

Professional boxing record 

|-
| style="text-align:center;" colspan="8"|50 Wins (37 knockouts), 13 Loss
|-  style="text-align:center; background:#e3e3e3;"
|  style="border-style:none none solid solid; "|Res.
|  style="border-style:none none solid solid; "|Record
|  style="border-style:none none solid solid; "|Opponent
|  style="border-style:none none solid solid; "|Type
|  style="border-style:none none solid solid; "|Rd.,Time
|  style="border-style:none none solid solid; "|Date
|  style="border-style:none none solid solid; "|Location
|  style="border-style:none none solid solid; "|Notes
|- align=center
|Loss||50-13||align=left| Junior Talipeau
|
|
|
|align=left|
|align=left|
|- align=center
|Loss||50-12||align=left| Jackson Junior
|
|
|
|align=left|
|align=left|
|- align=center
|Win||50-11||align=left| Bernardino Gonzalez
|
|
|
|align=left|
|align=left|
|- align=center
|Win||49-11||align=left| Claudio Omar Parra
|
|
|
|align=left|
|align=left|
|- align=center
|Win||48-11||align=left| Alejandro Gabriel Boatto
|
|
|
|align=left|
|align=left|
|- align=center
|Loss||47-11||align=left| Marcus Vinicius de Oliveira
|
|
|
|align=left|
|align=left|
|- align=center
|Win||47-10||align=left| Gustavo Daniel Boggio
|
|
|
|align=left|
|align=left|
|- align=center
|Win||46-10||align=left| Mario Javier Moreno
|
|
|
|align=left|
|align=left|
|- align=center
|Loss||45-10||align=left| Javier Alberto Mamani
|
|
|
|align=left|
|align=left|
|- align=center
|Loss||45-9||align=left| Miguel Angel Arroyo
|
|
|
|align=left|
|align=left|
|- align=center
|Loss||45-8||align=left| Shannan Taylor
|
|
|
|align=left|
|align=left|
|- align=center
|Loss||45-7||align=left| Javier Alberto Mamani
|
|
|
|align=left|
|align=left|

References
 

1974 births
Living people
Boxers from Buenos Aires
Boxers at the 1995 Pan American Games
Argentine male boxers
Pan American Games gold medalists for Argentina
Pan American Games medalists in boxing
Light-welterweight boxers
Medalists at the 1995 Pan American Games